Sarah L. Copeland-Hanzas (born July 9, 1970) is an American Democratic Party politician who is currently serving as the Secretary of State of Vermont. She previously served in the Vermont House of Representatives from Orange County's 2nd District, having been first elected in 2004.

Early life and career
Sarah Louise Copeland-Hanzas was born in  Lake Forest, Illinois on July 9, 1970 and her family moved to Vermont in 1971. She grew up in Corinth and graduated from Bradford's Oxbow High School in 1988. She then attended the University of Vermont from which she received a Bachelor of Arts in history in 1992 and a Bachelor of Arts in geology in 1993. In 1995, she completed her teaching certification at Upper Valley Educators Institute in Lebanon, New Hampshire.

After becoming qualified as a teacher, Copeland-Hanzas instructed secondary science in several Upper Connecticut River Valley public schools and at Valley Vista residential treatment center in Bradford. Beginning in 2010, she owned a small business in Bradford, the Local Buzz Cafe, which she operated until she closed it in 2021.

Political career
In 2004, Copeland-Hanzas was elected to the Vermont House of Representatives. She was reelected every two years through 2020, and served from January 2005 to January 2023. During her House service, Copeland-Hanzas was a member of the Health Care Committee and chair of the Government Operations Committee. From 2015 to 2017, she was the majority leader. While in the house, she also served on the Executive Committee of the National Conference of State Legislatures.

In 2022, Copeland-Hanzas was a candidate for the Democratic nomination for secretary of state. In the August primary, she defeated deputy secretary of state Chris Winters and Montpelier city clerk John Odum; Copeland-Hanzas received 43 percent of the vote to 41 for Winters and 16 for Odum. In the November general election, she defeated perennial Republican candidate H. Brooke Paige by a vote of 61 to 33 percent. She was sworn in for the beginning of her term in January 2023.

Family
Copeland is married to John P. Hanzas Jr. They reside in Bradford and are the parents of three daughters.

References

|-

1970 births
21st-century American politicians
21st-century American women politicians
Democratic Party members of the Vermont House of Representatives
Living people
People from Bradford, Vermont
People from Lake Forest, Illinois
Secretaries of State of Vermont
University of Vermont alumni
Women state legislators in Vermont